Finnøy is an island in Stavanger municipality in Rogaland county, Norway. The largest urban area on the island is the village of Judaberg which is located on the eastern shore of the island. The village of Hesby, on the western coast, is a historical seat of power dating back to the Middle Ages. Hesby is also the site of Hesby Church which dates back to around the year 1100 A.D. Prior to 2020, the island was part of Finnøy municipality.

Finnøy island is connected to the mainland by a series of bridges and undersea tunnels. Finnøy Tunnel connects Finnøy to the nearby island of Rennesøy, and to the nearby island of Talgje.  Finnøy also has regular ferry connections to most of the islands which surround it such as Ombo, Sjernarøyane, Halsnøya, and Fogn.

See also
List of islands of Norway

References

Islands of Rogaland
Islands of Stavanger